Västerfärnebo is a locality situated in Sala Municipality, Västmanland County, Sweden with 477 inhabitants in 2010.

References 

Populated places in Västmanland County
Populated places in Sala Municipality